, also known as "The Paper," is the protagonist in the Japanese novel series Read or Die and its manga and original video animation (OVA) spin-offs. She is also a major player (but not the protagonist) in the sequel, R.O.D the TV. She also makes a brief cameo appearance in Read or Dream.

She is a papermaster, a person with the ability to bend paper material to her will, making it bulletproof and durable enough to use as a weapon, among other, more creative applications.

Etymology

Yomi (読) in her first name means reading in Japanese, while -ko (子) (literally 'child') is a common suffix in Japanese female names, so her first name means Reading-woman. This has the same meaning as her surname Readman if neglecting gender differences.  The name is also shared by book publisher Yomiko Classics.

Character background
Through much of the R.O.D series, Yomiko works as a secret field agent for the British Library, using her papermastery to thwart the British Library's foes and collect valuable books and documents. Yomiko's code name is "The Paper" (while this is said in English even in Japanese dialogue, English dubs often turn this into "Agent Paper" or "Miss Paper" to make dialogue more smooth). She is the 19th person to serve the Library in this capacity. Yomiko is assigned her missions by the British Library special operations commander, codenamed "Mr. Joker." She often works with partners, such as the American mercenary Drake Anderson, the clumsy but capable junior field agent Wendy Earhart, and the suave wall-phasing gunslinger girl, Nancy Makuhari.

When not on missions for the British Library, Yomiko works as a substitute teacher, a job through which she meets her favorite author, Nenene Sumiregawa. She resides somewhere in Jinbōchō, a neighborhood of Chiyoda, Tokyo known for its large number of used bookstores. She occupies a small shack at the top of an apartment building called  (the building itself is used entirely to contain her book collection).

Read or Die
Yomiko was trained by Donnie Nakajima, who served as the British Library's 18th Agent Paper. Yomiko was deeply in love with Donnie. After he failed in one of his missions (burning a British noble's book collection in the novels; refusing to find the "Book of Truth" in the manga), Donnie was killed because of the failure, which was labeled as betrayal by Joker.  He was then used as a card to trigger Yomiko's power of a paper master. Yomiko recalls that she killed Donnie in her memories in both manga and novel, and is greatly troubled by that.  In the manga, the "Donnie" killed by Yomiko is actually another paper master in disguise, which followed Joker's order to help Yomiko in discovering her power, and he appeared in the story later to retell the true events. This part of the story is yet to be told in the novel's last volume, and Donnie's death by Yomiko's awakening power is the only known factor, why Yomiko killed him is unknown. She became the 19th Agent named The Paper after the incident.

In the novels only, she worked for the British Library until she was kidnapped by a character named Faust, who took her to Dokusensha headquarters in China.

The novels and the manga recount Yomiko's first meeting with her favorite author, 17-year-old prodigy Nenene Sumiregawa. Kidnapped by a vicious kidnapper, Nenene is rescued by Yomiko, and they become fast friends afterward.

In the manga, Yomiko goes undercover at a private academy while searching for something called "The Underground Library"—but she is also there because of a mysterious letter she believes to be from her presumed-dead love Donnie. The Donnie-imposter turns out to be a former friend of Donnie's, Ridley Wan, who seeks the Underground Library, and its contents, the "Book of Truth" for himself. He blames Yomiko on Donnie's death. Yomiko becomes entangled in a complex conflict involving Ridley, the superhuman "A" class students at the academy, and the British Library. When Joker reveals his plan to use the Book of Truth for his own, evil purposes, Yomiko manages to stop him, but the Underground Library "awakens" and appears to devour Yomiko as she protects everyone from its destructive forces. The end of the story hints she is still alive, but whereabouts unknown.

Read or Die OVA

The OVA does not carry on from the books or manga and picks up with her still working loyally for the British Library, where she meets a new partner in espionage, Nancy Makuhari, aka "Miss Deep" (introduced as a new character, although she existed previously in the novels). Little history is provided on Yomiko in the OVA.

R.O.D the TV
At the beginning of R.O.D the TV, Yomiko is missing in action. Four years before the start of the series, she is provoked by Joker and ends up in a moment of temporary psychosis, assaulting the library with her papermastery and causing it to go down in flames. She is later revealed to be in hiding while protecting Miss Deep's clone, also called Nancy. She has abandoned and betrayed the British Library upon learning of Joker's plot to use the second Nancy's son as a vessel to be overtaken by the mind of Mr. Gentleman, the founder of the British Library.

Since much of Yomiko's history is deeply integrated into most R.O.D plots, further information on her can be found in the respective articles on each series.

Appearance and personality
Yomiko is a woman of English and Japanese descent (though Nenene describes her as looking "100% Japanese" in her "missing persons" ad). She is a light-skinned woman of average height with dark blue eyes long straight black hair. She is of slender built yet sports a noticeably curvaceous and well-endowed figure. In a series where most characters enjoy frequent changes of costume, Yomiko always wears her British Library uniform: red tie, white blouse, brown waistcoat, and brown skirt; she also usually wears a roomy buff overcoat. Even when she leaves the British Library in the TV, she still wears the same outfit, only swapping the necktie for a small red ribbon instead. Yomiko sports enormous, black, square-rimmed glasses; in the manga she reveals these were Donnie Nakajima's, and she refuses to remove them even when sleeping. Her measurements are 34-23-34 (86-59-87 in centimeters).

Yomiko is introverted and has bibliomania, often preferring the company of books over people. She goes to extreme lengths to hold onto and finish reading something she has started; for example, when attacked by a giant insect, she is more concerned that the insect's rider stole the book she was reading than by the insect itself. The only time she has actively rejected books was in the manga, too distraught in thinking about her past with Donnie.

While a capable secret agent, Yomiko is extremely kind-hearted by nature and exceedingly polite. She tends to believe everyone is inherently good, and has difficulty thinking of even her enemies as bad people. Her idea of asking someone to surrender is, "Please, don't" (or "Please give me back my book"). In fighting she tends towards defense and incapacitation, and only wounds or kills when she is faced with no other alternative. However, due to her traumatic past involving Donnie, and her dedication toward protecting others, she can be manipulated into moments of extreme instability—in one such moment revealed in R.O.D the TV, her paper mastery went so out of control that she destroyed much of the British Library with paper weapons and subsequent flame.

Yomiko's occupation as a school teacher is natural reflection of her nature, as she often feels drawn to both protecting and providing mentorship to young people, including young Nenene Sumiregawa, the students at Manshu Academy (R.O.D manga), and Anita King (R.O.D the TV)--the latter despite Anita's great resentment towards Yomiko because of her role in the British Library fire.

Skills and powers
Yomiko's telekinetic ability to manipulate paper into bulletproof shields, swords, working giant paper airplanes, models of Big Ben, etc. surpasses the abilities of most other paper masters in the R.O.D universe. The effects she can create are limited only by her imagination. She is able to slow the burning rate of paper dramatically, and can work with paper that is slightly wet (complete and utter saturation will still disrupt her paper mastery, but only in that moment). She can command very large volumes of paper and change their shape, speed, and direction easily. Yomiko can also manipulate paper with her mouth, as evidenced in the OVA when she manages to free her hands from a pair of metal cuffs with only a thin piece of paper braided into her hair.

Yomiko can store impossibly large amounts of paper and reading materials in her overcoat pockets and even within her hair, making her difficult to "disarm."

In the novels, British Library's Q-equivalent Jiggy Stardust gives Yomiko special paper which is durable, waterproof, and can perform special functions; for example, the paper can be coated with explosive chemicals which can be triggered by her powers at will.

Although Yomiko's paper mastery is her most impressive ability, she also displays great agility (with the exception of the first novel, in which she is clumsy; she explains that this is because she hasn't read any action novels recently). She is a capable enough sword fighter to fend off a trained samurai. Her extensive book-learning makes her a fountain of knowledge from the grand to the trivial. She can also read extremely fast; the novels note she is able to memorize every word in a book with only ten minutes' reading. She also has the ability to decipher languages she did not learn before to a certain level, enabling her to read books in exotic languages.

Yomiko's greatest weaknesses are in the social and psychological realms—being unassertive, sentimental, and overly trusting, she is easily manipulated and distracted. On the other hand, her kindness has also earned her the loyalty of a few but powerful (or at least stubborn) allies.

Relationships

Donnie Nakajima
With the manga to go by, Yomiko was head-over-heels in love with Donnie and deeply traumatized by his death at her hands. She wears his glasses, with the idea that when she reads, he sees what she is reading. Yomiko can get violent if someone touches her glasses. Often when thinking of the past she touches her glasses self-consciously. In the TV, Joker implies Donnie's fate is even worse than Yomiko thought, sparking her temporary insanity during which she destroyed the British Library.

Nenene Sumiregawa
Yomiko loved Nenene Sumiregawa before ever meeting her, sharing the joy of reading the young author's novels with her mentor and romantic partner Donnie Nakajima. When Yomiko met Nenene she begged her for her autograph, but didn't earn it until she had rescued the author from a vicious kidnapper. The two quickly became fast friends, and Nenene even followed Yomiko on her assignments for the British Library.

When Yomiko disappeared before the start of R.O.D the TV, Nenene was devastated, and Yomiko came to deeply regret abandoning her. Fortunately they were able to reforge their friendship.

Nancy Makuhari ("Miss Deep")
One of Yomiko's partners at the British Library, Nancy Makuhari, codename "Miss Deep" is a somewhat mischievous, sultry agent who quickly grows close to Yomiko as the two embark in a number of missions for the library as teammates.

In the R.O.D OVA, Miss Deep befriends Yomiko quickly. The two share a strong bond through the series, to the point where romantic overtones are possibly implied. Nancy appears to betray Yomiko in the second episode—but that turns out to be Nancy's clone, loyal to the I-Jin Soujun Ikkyu. Miss Deep nearly dies rescuing Yomiko from Ikkyu's trap and betrays Ikkyu in the final episode so Yomiko can escape—but remains aboard a doomed rocket as Yomiko helplessly falls away from her with a parachute. An extremely distraught Yomiko finds in her hand Nancy's last request written on a crumpled bookmark that Yomiko had given her earlier as a keepsake: "Please take care of my younger sister."

Nancy the Clone
Seen only in the animated R.O.D adventures, Miss Deep's clone is originally Yomiko's enemy, capturing her on behalf of the enemy I-jin leader, Soujun Ikkyu. However, Miss Deep nearly kills her, and the clone loses much of her memory due to brain damage caused by asphyxiation. Yomiko, honoring Miss Deep's last request, vows to protect her. She fails, however, to protect Nancy's son after his birth, and only manages to escape with Nancy and go into hiding, telling Nancy that her son died.

Through much of the TV, the recovering, childlike Nancy's world revolves entirely around Yomiko. Even when Yomiko reveals that Nancy's son lives and that she lied to her, Nancy easily forgives her (though Yomiko is much less forgiving of herself). Nancy matures by the end of the series but remains devoted to Yomiko.

Wendy Earhart
In all R.O.D stories except R.O.D the TV, Wendy is Yomiko's devoted friend and fellow agent. While Wendy is a less experienced agent, it is sometimes her job to keep Yomiko from getting distracted. She worries greatly when Yomiko is in danger, even when Joker—to whom Wendy is extremely loyal—is less concerned.

In the TV, an older and very jaded Wendy is bitter about Yomiko's causing the British Library fire, feeling betrayed by the woman who was once her hero. She has little difficulty fighting on opposite sides from Yomiko—although when it comes down to the wire, Wendy still cannot shoot to kill.

Anita King
In the TV, young Anita is a victim of the British Library fire and recalls Yomiko's silhouette standing out amid the flames in her most traumatic memory. When Anita learns the truth of her memory, she is extremely harsh and unforgiving toward Yomiko, although Yomiko as always remains apologetic and gentle toward the teenage girl. When forced to work together to fight the British Library, Yomiko manages to teach Anita a few things about papermastery tactics and demonstrates Anita's further potential by showing her how to fly a giant paper airplane over the mountains of Saitama.

Although the meeting is much less significant compared to their interactions in the television series, Yomiko makes a brief cameo appearance in the Read or Dream manga at the end where she coincidentally encounters Anita at the park and senses Anita's close connection to books despite Anita's denial and helps the girl realize how books have helped her find the friends and family she has.

References

External links
Official English R.O.D the TV site
R.O.D -THE TV- Official site 

Female characters in anime and manga
Fictional British secret agents
Fictional librarians
Fictional schoolteachers
Fictional telekinetics
Fictional bibliophiles